Andamia cyclocheilus is a species of combtooth blenny which is known from a single specimen from Atjatuning, western New Guinea. The IUCN rate it as Data Deficient because its taxonomy is unclear. It is associated with reefs.

References

cyclocheilus
Fish described in 1909